Thomas James Hurst is an American photographer, pastor, and entrepreneur/inventor.

Biography
Hurst was born in San Francisco, California, in 1971 and grew up in Mill Valley, California, graduating from Tamalpais High School in 1989. In the summer of 1992, Hurst traveled to the war raging in Bosnia and at the age of 21 he took his first photograph inside the besieged city of Sarajevo. Hurst returned to Marin County, California where he had been studying cultural anthropology at the College of Marin Community College in Kentfield, California and he began focusing solely on photography. Hurst returned to the war in Bosnia again the following Summer of 1993 and Upon his return home, Hurst completed his studies at College of Marin and transferred to San Francisco State University enrolling in the University's Photojournalism program studying under Professor Ken Kobre. During winter and summer breaks Hurst traveled to Afghanistan, Haiti and Rwanda, where he worked for such publications as Time, The New York Times, and The Boston Globe. It was his work in Rwanda that earned him two World Press Photo Awards. In 1997 Hurst was offered a staff position with The Boston Globe, where he was on staff for two years. Leaving The Boston Globe to pursue his international freelancing, setting his base of operations in Seattle, Washington. In March 1999, Hurst accepted an assignment for Time magazine, spending two months covering the war in Kosovo, which garnered him his third World Press Photo Award. Upon his return to Seattle, Hurst was offered a staff position at the Seattle Times, where he spent 10 years covering local, national, and international news. In the fall of 1999 Hurst was part of the Seattle Times photo staff coverage of the World Trade Organization (WTO) Riots in Seattle which led the Times Photo Department to finish as the finalist in the 2000 Pulitzer Prize for Breaking News Photography behind the Rocky Mountain News' Staff coverage of the Columbine School Massacre in Littleton, Colorado. In 2004 Hurst spent a month imbedded with US troops in the Iraq war and then he returned to Pakistan to cover the earthquake in Kashmir where work earned the Photograph of the Year award by Editor & Publisher magazine. During his 10 years at the Seattle Times, Hurst earned numerous regional awards from the Associated Press and the Society of Professional Journalists.

In May 2009 Hurst resigned his position at the Seattle Times and stepped away from his 20-year career as a photojournalist, accepting a position as the Operational Director for Mars Hill Church in Bellevue, Washington. In 2011, Hurst became the Lead Pastor at Mars Hill Bellevue during the church's relocation from a school gymnasium to a 25,000-square-foot building in the center of Bellevue's Downtown District. The church has grown from 1,000 members to 3,000 in the last two years. In 2014, two days after the church announced that they would be dissolving Hurst resigned as a pastor at Mars Hill Church.

In March 2014 Hurst stepped into the world of small business and entrepreneurship with his invention and launch of the iPhone 5/5s COVR Photo Lens case for the mobile market. The COVR Photo Lens case contained a lens built into the case, allowing users to take pictures in an entirely new way. COVR LLC was Hurst's first start-up company and the COVRPhoto Lens his first product.

References

External links
 

Living people
1971 births
American photographers
Tamalpais High School alumni
San Francisco State University alumni
Place of birth missing (living people)